Oamaruia is a genus of sea snails, marine gastropod mollusks in the family Cancellariidae, the nutmeg snails.

Species
Species within the genus Oamaruia include:

 Oamaruia deleta Finlay, 1930

References

Cancellariidae
Monotypic gastropod genera